Punainen viiva (Finnish for "Red Line") can refer to:

 Punainen viiva (book), 1909 book by Ilmari Kianto and basis of the below film and opera
 Red Line (1959 film), film by Matti Kassila
 The Red Line, opera by Aulis Sallinen

See also
 Red Line (disambiguation)